Prince Charming (French: Le prince charmant) is a 1942 French comedy film directed by Jean Boyer and starring Lucien Baroux, Renée Faure and Jimmy Gaillard.

The film's sets were designed by the art director Jacques Colombier.

Cast
 Lucien Baroux as Ambroise Bréchaud  
 Renée Faure as Rosine  
 Jimmy Gaillard as Thierry  
 Christian Gérard as Arsène  
 Robert Arnoux as Ernest  
 Sabine André as Ginette  
 Germaine Lix as Madame Bréchaud  
 Germaine Godefroid as La comtesse  
 Louis Florencie as François 
 Jean-Louis Allibert as Valentin  
 André Ekian as Et son orchestre  
 Pierre Ferval 
 Guita Karen 
 Lucienne Legrand
 Jacqueline Marbaux 
 Franck Maurice 
 Maurice Salabert as Le patron du café  
 Simone Signoret 
 Renée Thorel 
 André Varennes 
 Léon Walther as Le comte de Danrémont

References

Bibliography 
 Hayward, Susan. Simone Signoret: The Star as Cultural Sign. A&C Black, 2004.

External links 
 

1942 films
French comedy films
1942 comedy films
1940s French-language films
Films directed by Jean Boyer
French black-and-white films
1940s French films